Arnica fulgens is a species of arnica known by the common names foothill arnica and hillside arnica. It is native to western North America, from British Columbia east to Saskatchewan and south as far as Inyo County, California, and McKinley County, New Mexico. It grows in open, grassy areas.

Arnica fulgens is a perennial herb growing from a short, tough rhizome and producing one or more hairy, glandular, mostly naked stems to heights between 10 and 60 centimeters. The leaves are mainly located around the base of the plant. They are broadly lance-shaped to oval-shaped and have tufts of woolly fibers in their axils. They are up to 12 centimeters long, and there may be a few much shorter ones further up the stem.

The inflorescence holds usually one, but sometimes 2 or 3, daisylike flower heads lined in hairy phyllaries. Each head has a center of glandular golden disc florets lined with golden ray florets which are 1 to 3 centimeters long. The fruit is an achene with a hairy body half a centimeter long and a light-colored pappus. Flowers bloom May to July.

References

External links
Jepson Manual Treatment
United States Department of Agriculture Plants Profile
Calphotos Photo gallery, University of California

fulgens
Plants described in 1813
Flora of Western Canada
Flora of the Northwestern United States
Flora of the Southwestern United States
Flora of North Dakota
Flora of South Dakota
Flora without expected TNC conservation status